Christopher Ryan Gerse (born October 19, 1991) is an American actor. He is best known for his role as Will Roberts (later to be known as Will Horton) on the daytime television series Days of Our Lives. For that role he received two Young Artist Award nominations for Best Performance in a Television Series, in 2004 for Supporting Young Actor, and in 2005 for Recurring Young Actor. He was born in Los Angeles, California.

Filmography

References

External links

1991 births
Male actors from Los Angeles
American male child actors
American male soap opera actors
American male television actors
Living people